Royal is the second full-length album by Jamaican reggae artist Jesse Royal, released on June 11, 2021. Royal received a nomination for Best Reggae Album at the 2022 Grammy Awards. The 11-track album was released with NYC-based Easy Star Records. On his sophomore album, Jesse Royal is accompanied by fellow Jamaican artists Vybz Kartel, Protoje, Runkus, Kumar, and Samory I, as well as Ghanaian musician Stonebwoy and others

Track listing

References 

2021 albums
Reggae albums by Jamaican artists